Harbhajan Singh Khalsa (born Harbhajan Singh Puri) (August 26, 1929 – October 6, 2004), popularly known as Yogi Bhajan, and also Siri Singh Sahib to his followers, was an Indian-born American entrepreneur, yoga guru, and spiritual teacher. He introduced his version of Kundalini Yoga to the United States. He was the spiritual director of the 3HO (Healthy, Happy, Holy Organization) Foundation (and business ventures), with over 300 centers in 35 countries.

Harbhajan Singh has been accused posthumously of sexual abuse by hundreds of his female followers; an investigation called the Olive Branch Report found the allegations most likely true.

Biography

Early life 

Harbhajan Singh Khalsa was born on August 26, 1929 into a Sikh family in Kot Harkarn, Gujranwala district, in the province of Punjab (now in Pakistan). His father, Dr. Kartar Singh Puri, served the British Raj as a medical doctor. His mother was named Harkrishan Kaur. His father was raised in the Sikh tradition and young Harbhajan was educated in a Catholic school run by nuns. Singh learned the fundamentals of Sikhism from his paternal grandfather, Sant Bhai Fateh Singh. Theirs was a well-to-do landlord family, owning most of their village in the foothills of the Himalayas.

Khalsa's schooling was interrupted in 1947 by the violent partition of India, when he and his family fled to New Delhi as refugees. There, Harbhajan Singh attended Camp College – a hastily put together arrangement for thousands of refugee students – and was an active member of the Sikh Students Federation in Delhi. Four years later, he graduated with a master's degree in economics.

In 1953, Harbhajan Singh entered the service of the Government of India. He served in the Revenue Department, where his duties took him all over India. Eventually, Harbhajan Singh was promoted to a customs inspector at Delhi airport.

In his final years in India, he also learned from Baba Virsa Singh at Gobind Sadan Institute.

Coming west 
In 1968, Harbhajan Singh emigrated to Toronto, Canada equipped with an endorsement from that country's High Commissioner to India, James George, who was also a student of his. Harbhajan Singh made a considerable impact in the predominantly Anglo-Saxon metropolis. In three months, he established classes at several YMCAs, co-founded a yoga centre, was interviewed for national press and television, and helped set in motion the creation of eastern Canada's first Sikh temple in time for Guru Nanak's five hundredth birthday the following year.

Healthy, Happy, Holy Organization 

In 1969, Harbhajan Singh established the 3HO (Healthy, Happy, Holy Organization) Foundation in Los Angeles, California to further his missionary work. His brand of Sikhism appealed to the hippies who formed the bulk of his early converts. The Sikh practice of not cutting one's hair or beard was already accepted by the hippie culture, as was Sikh vegetarianism. They liked to experience elevated states of awareness and they also deeply wanted to feel they were contributing to a world of peace and social justice. He offered them all these things with vigorous yoga, an embracing holistic vision, and an optimistic spirit of sublime destiny.
Interest in yoga increased worldwide at this time. To serve the changing times, Harbhajan Singh created the International Kundalini Yoga Teachers Association, dedicated to setting standards for teachers and the propagation of the teachings. In 1994, the 3HO Foundation joined the United Nations as a non-governmental organization in consultative status with the Economic and Social Council, representing women's issues, promoting human rights, and providing education about alternative systems of medicine.

Aquarian age timeline 

Harbhajan Singh incorporated the storyline of the dawning new age into his teachings, a case of melding Western astrology with Sikh tradition. He proclaimed that "Guru Nanak was the Guru for the Aquarian Age." It was, he declared, to be an age where people first experienced God, then believed, rather than the old way of believing and then being liberated by one's faith.

Inter-faith work 

In the summer of 1970, Harbhajan Singh participated in an informal "Holy Man Jam" at the University of Colorado at Boulder with Swami Satchidananda (another Eastern yogi who has been accused of sexual abuse of his students), Stephen Gaskin of The Farm in Tennessee, Zen Buddhist Jakusho Kwong, and other local spiritual leaders. A few weeks later, he organized a gathering of spiritual teachers to engage and inspire the 200,000 attendees of the Atlanta International Pop Festival on the stage between the performances of the bands.

Political influence in U.S. 
When U.S. President Nixon called drugs America's "Number one domestic problem", Harbhajan Singh Khalsa launched a pilot program with two longtime heroin addicts in Washington, D.C. in 1972. The program attempted to treat heroin addiction through the practice of yoga and the consumption of garlic juice.

Alleged sexual abuse 
In 2019, Yogi Bhajan's former secretary Pamela Saharah Dyson published the book Premka: White Bird in a Golden Cage: My Life with Yogi Bhajan, reporting that she and other women had sexual relationships with Harbhajan Singh.
In March 2020, anti-cult activist Be Scofield published an article in her magazine The Guru reporting sexual abuse and rape of female followers and assistants including Dyson by Harbhajan Singh, based on "over a dozen original interviews". That same month, the Siri Singh Sahib Corporation commissioned An Olive Branch (AOB) to look into the allegations. The AOB report, published in August, found that it was "more likely than not" that Yogi Bhajan raped three women, injured eight women during sex, engaged in nonconsensual touching of nine people, showed pornography to minors, used sexually offensive language, directed women to shave their pubic hair, and directed women to have sex with other women, that his followers' claims that he was celibate were inaccurate, and that he "employed a variety of methods to control his students including compartmentalization, quid pro quo, promises, threats, slander, phone calls, guarding, and/or telling women they were his wife." The report acknowledged "the convictions of Yogi Bhajan's Supporters as accurate representations of their beliefs" rather than deliberate falsehoods. Soon after, other media published stories based on the report that considered the allegations to be true.

Obituaries and memorials 

Harbhajan Singh died of complications of heart failure at his home in Española, New Mexico, on October 6, 2004, aged 75. He was survived by his wife, sons, daughter and five grandchildren. Obituaries appeared in The Los Angeles Times, the Times of India, The New York Times, and Yoga Journal. Khalsa's passing was noted by the Shiromani Gurdwara Parbandhak Committee, which closed its offices to commemorate his death.

The State of New Mexico honored him by renaming State Highway 106 as the Yogi Bhajan Memorial Highway. The New Mexico Government took the unprecedented measure of flying its flags at half-mast for two days (Oct 7–8) in honour of Yogi Bhajan after his death on Oct 6, and declared Oct 23 "Yogi Bhajan Memorial Day".

Reception

Media coverage 
In 1977 Time published a critical article, titled "Yogi Bhajan's Synthetic Sikhism". The article alleged that Gurucharan Singh Tohra, former President of the Shiromani Gurdwara Parbandhak Committee (SGPC), had stated that Harbhajan Singh is not the leader of Sikhism in the Western World as he claimed, and that Tohra had denied the SGPC had ever given Singh the title of Siri Singh Sahib.

Harbhajan Singh is featured in books discussing the successes of Sikhs who migrated from India to the West, including Surjit Kaur's Among the Sikhs: Reaching for the Stars. and Gurmukh Singh's The Global Indian: The Sikhs.

Scholars' views on Singh 
Scholars including Verne A. Dusenbery and Pashaura Singh have concurred that Harbhajan Singh's introduction of Sikh teachings into the West helped identify Sikhism as a world religion while at the same time creating a compelling counter-narrative to that which identified Sikhs solely as a race with a shared history in India.

The historian of Sikhism Trilochan Singh offered a contrasting perspective in his critical work entitled "Sikhism and Tantric Yoga." "I am extremely worried about the manner in which Yogi Bhajan teaches Sikhism to American young men and women whose sincerity, nobility of purpose, and rare passion for oriental wisdom and genuine mystical experiences is unquestionably unique. I do not care what fantastic interpretations of Kundalini Yoga he gives, the like of which I have never read in any Tantra text, nor known from any living Tantric scholar. I am not prepared to take seriously his newly invented Guru Yoga in which his pious and uncritical followers must concentrate on a particular picture of Yogi Bhajan, which practice is called mental beaming."

Philip Deslippe, a historian of American religion, wrote a 2012 article "From Maharaj to Mahan Tantric: The Construction of Yogi Bhajan's Kundalini Yoga", using 3HO source archive material and news articles to reveal how Harbhajan Singh recreated his own story after his first trip back to India:

References

External links 

 The Yogi Bhajan Library of Teachings
 The Yogi Bhajan Biography
 Students of Yogi Bhajan

Indian emigrants to the United States
1929 births
2004 deaths
People from Gujranwala
American Sikhs
American people of Punjabi descent
American people of Indian descent
American businesspeople
People from Española, New Mexico
Modern yoga gurus